Bad Blood is a 2017 Australian thriller film directed by David Pulbrook and starring Xavier Samuel and Morgan Griffin.

Plot synopsis
Carrie (Morgan Griffin) is a veterinarian who goes on a weekend holiday with her fiancée Vincent (Xavier Samuel), who is a best-selling author. They spend the weekend at an isolated house in the middle of the desolate forest where Carrie finds that Vincent may not be what he seems.

Cast
 Morgan Griffin as Carrie
 Xavier Samuel as Vincent
 Tess Fowler as Kate
 Rob Macpherson as Mitchell
 Elena Carapetis as Rose
 Patrick Frost as Pete

References

External links

Australian thriller films
2017 films
2017 thriller films
2010s English-language films
2010s Australian films